XLfit is a Microsoft Excel add-in that can perform regression analysis, curve fitting, and statistical analysis. It is approved by the UK National Physical Laboratory and the US National Institute of Standards and Technology XLfit can generate 2D and 3D graphs and analyze data sets. XLfit can also analyse the statistical data. It includes over seventy linear and non-linear curve fitting models. Predefined categories include: 
 Exponential/Log, Power Series, Sigmoidal, Hyperbolic, Yield Density, Linear, Polynomial, Dose Response, Pharmacology, Equilibrium and Inhibition.
 Levenberg-Marquardt fitting algorithm.

A range of statistical calculations can also be applied to the data from within the spreadsheet. Example statistics include:
 F-test and t-test
 Area under the curve / ROC
 Confidence intervals
 Error values relating to parameter values or any point on the curve.

Available statistical models include Spearman's rank correlations, Student's t-test, Mann–Whitney U test, least squares, and ANOVA, among others. A model editor also allows users to add their own models and statistics to the ones provided.

Usage 
XLfit was validated by The UK National Physical Laboratory in 2004; the unit tests for this are provided in the model editor from version 5.4 onwards to allow each version to be easily validated.

XLfit was used by NASA to analyze the battery life of the Curiosity Mars Lander.

Licenses 
XLift is a proprietary software. It offers the following licensing options. 
 XLfit 5 Commercial License 
 XLfit 5 Academic License
 E-learning

Version history 
 2002.8 XLfit 2.0.11
 2002.5 XLfit 3.0.2
 2003.11 XLfit 4.0.1 
 2005.6 XLfit 4.1.1
 2005.6 XLfit 4.2.0
 2008.7 XLfit 4.3.2
 2009.4 XLfit 5.1.0
 2009.7 XLfit 5.1.1
 2009.11 XLfit 5.2.0
 2010.11 XLfit 5.2.2
 2011.11 XLfit 5.3.0
 2012.1 XLfit 5.3.1
 2014.5 XLfit 5.4.0
 2015.5 XLfit 5.5.0

See also 

 List of numerical analysis software
 List of statistical packages
 Comparison of statistical packages

References

External links 
 XLfit Website

Plotting software
Data analysis software
Windows-only software